Graham Rogers (born December 17, 1990) is an American actor, known for his roles as Scott Thomas in the comedy film Struck by Lightning (2012), Danny Matheson in NBC's science fiction series Revolution, Al Jardine in the biopic Love and Mercy (2014), Carson in the thriller Careful What You Wish For (2015), and Tyler Stone in Hulu's comedy series Resident Advisors.

Rogers had a recurring role as Evan Chapin in the Netflix series Atypical, and previously starred as Caleb Haas in ABC's drama-thriller series Quantico.

Early life
Rogers was born in West Chester, Pennsylvania, to John and Susan Rogers. He has four siblings: one older sister, two older brothers, and one younger brother. Graham attended West Chester East High School. When he was eighteen, he moved to Los Angeles, California, to pursue an acting career.

Career
Rogers made a guest appearance in an episode of the TNT drama series Memphis Beat. In 2012, he played Scott Thomas, a flamboyant member of Clover High's drama department, in the film Struck by Lightning. In 2013, Rogers co-starred as Henry Iris in the film Crazy Kind of Love, which is also known as Long Time Gone. He then landed a television role as Danny Matheson in the NBC drama series Revolution. In 2014, Rogers appeared in a biographical film about the life of singer-songwriter Brian Wilson of The Beach Boys, Love and Mercy. The following year, Rogers co-starred in the independent thriller film Careful What You Wish For (2015), alongside Nick Jonas. That same year, he had a main role in the Hulu comedy series Resident Advisors as Tyler Stone. Also in 2015, Rogers was cast in ABC's thriller series Quantico, portraying FBI recruit Caleb Haas. In 2017, Rogers had a recurring role as Smitty in the fifth season of Showtime's crime drama series Ray Donovan. On April 2, 2018, it was announced by Deadline, that Rogers was promoted to a series regular role, ahead of the premiere of the sixth season of Ray Donovan.

Personal life
Rogers dated Pretty Little Liars star Lucy Hale, which was revealed by her in an interview with Us Weekly. In July 2013, it was rumored that the couple had ended their relationship after 3 months.

Filmography

Film

Television

References

External links
 
 

1990 births
21st-century American male actors
American male child actors
American male film actors
American male television actors
Living people
Male actors from Pennsylvania
People from West Chester, Pennsylvania